The Australian National Track Championships are held annually and are composed of competitions of various track cycling disciplines across various age, gender and disability categories.

Men

Senior

Team Pursuit

Team Sprint

Madison

Junior

Team Sprint

Women

Senior

Team Pursuit

Team Sprint

Madison

Junior

References
2009 Results, Cycling Australia
2010 Australian Track Cycling Championships - results
2011 Scody Cycling Australia Track National Championships Event Schedule & Results
Cycling Australia Live Results
Cycling Australia Track Honour Roll

Cycle racing in Australia
National track cycling championships
Cycling